Stapfiella is a genus of flowering plants belonging to the family Passifloraceae. It is also in the Subfamily Turneroideae.

Its native range is Africa; it is found in Burundi, Congo, Rwanda, Tanzania, Uganda, Zambia and Zaïre.

The genus name of Stapfiella is in honour of Otto Stapf (1857–1933), an Austrian born botanist and taxonomist. 
It was first described and published in G.W.J. Mildbraed (ed.), Wiss. Erg. Deut. Zentr.-Afr. Exped., Bot. Vol.2 on page 571 in 1913.

Known species
According to Kew;

References

Passifloraceae
Malpighiales genera
Plants described in 1913
Flora of West-Central Tropical Africa
Flora of East Tropical Africa
Afromontane flora